Heatwave! is an American disaster movie that was broadcast on the ABC television network on January 26, 1974. It was an ABC Movie of the Week.  Its running time was 90 minutes. The film was directed by Jerry Jameson, produced by Herbert F. Solow and Harve Bennett.

The plot focuses upon the effect an intense and prolonged heat wave and water shortage has on Frank Taylor and his pregnant wife Laura Taylor, both while they are in the city where they live and after they decide to relocate.

Plot
When the heat wave eventually causes a total blackout that shuts down the brokerage firm where Frank works, he and Laura decide to relocate to a mountain cabin in a remote small town—which is also affected by the heat, blackout, and water shortage.

On the way to the cabin, the Taylors' car is taken from them; and they are forced to walk eight miles to the town. When the Taylors reach the town, they go to see Dr. Grayson, who appears to be Laura's old family physician. Dr. Grayson advises Laura that it is important for her to rest given the stress she has been under in the hot, dry conditions.

After Laura has seen the doctor, the Taylors go to the cabin and find two young hikers have taken shelter there. After being briefly angry, the Taylors decide to allow the hikers to stay.

Laura rests in the cabin. However, she still gives birth prematurely.

After the baby is born, Dr. Grayson states the baby cannot survive without being in an incubator, particularly because of the extreme conditions. Dr. Grayson also states that he not only has no incubator but that he would be unable to run one as he has no fuel for his generator. (He is out, and the pumps fuel stations use are powered by electricity). However, with the assistance of the hikers and two town residents, Frank is able to build and power a makeshift incubator.

When the baby has been placed in the incubator, the characters hear that it is raining, which—in the movie—indicates the heat wave has broken and the water shortage will end.

Principal cast
 Frank Taylor: Ben Murphy
 Laura Taylor: Bonnie Bedelia
 Arnold Brady: David Huddleston
 Dr. Grayson: Lew Ayres
 Jerry Roberts: Lionel Johnston
 Toler: John Anderson
 Prescott: Dana Elcar
 Harry Powers: Robert Hogan
 Susan: Janit Baldwin

Donald Mantooth, the younger brother of Randolph Mantooth played an ambulance attendant. Randolph Mantooth portrayed famous fictional paramedic John Gage in Emergency!

Alternate titles
This movie is also known by other titles outside the United States; they include the European English name of Heatwave and the French name of 120 degrés Fahrenheit.

External links
 

1974 films
1974 television films
1970s disaster films
ABC Movie of the Week
American disaster films
Disaster television films
Films directed by Jerry Jameson
Films produced by Harve Bennett
Films set in California
Films set in Los Angeles
1970s American films